Ivy Keith Lacsina (born October 21, 1999) is a Filipino volleyball player. She was a member  of NU Lady Bulldogs collegiate women's University team in the UAAP. She currently plays for the F2 Logistics Cargo Movers.

Volleyball career

UAAP
Lacsina is currently playing for NU Lady Bulldogs in the University Athletic Association of the Philippines.

In 2021, Lacsina joined Rebisco Philippines in the 2021 Asian Women's Club Volleyball Championship.

In 2022, Lacsina and her team NU Lady Bulldogs won in the UAAP Season 84 volleyball tournaments against De La Salle University in the UAAP Finals.

PVL
In September 2022, F2 Logistics Cargo Movers announced that Ivy Lacsina will play for their team in the Premier Volleyball League.

Clubs

Collegiate
  - (2019–2022)

Clubs
 BaliPure Purest Water Defenders - (2018)
  F2 Logistics Cargo Movers - (2022-present)

Awards

Collegiate 
  UAAP Season 84 volleyball tournaments - Champions with (NU Lady Bulldogs)

References 

Filipino women's volleyball players
Living people
1999 births
Middle blockers